Qeshlaq-e Ali Shobani (also Romanized as Qeshlāq-e Alī Shoʿbānī) is a village in Qeshlaq-e Sharqi Rural District, Qeshlaq Dasht District, Bileh Savar County, Ardabil Province, Iran. At the 2006 census, its population was 171, in 41 families.

References 

Towns and villages in Bileh Savar County